is a Japanese publishing company founded on June 10, 1897.

Magazines

Monthly
Body+
Comic Candoll
GarrRV
Garuru
Misty
Monthly Bijutsu
Monthly J-novel
Waggle

Quarterly
Kabuka Yohō
NAIL VENUS

Defunct
Jitsugyō no Nihon
Fujin Sekai
Nihon shōnen
Shōjo no tomo 
Manga Sunday
My Birthday

Manga
Mansun Comics
Mansun Q Comics
MB Comics
Jippi English Comics (bilingual Japanese-English)
 Jungle Emperor Leo (Kimba the White Lion)
 Mighty Atom (Astro Boy)

References

External links
Official website 

Book publishing companies of Japan
Magazine publishing companies of Japan
Manga distributors
Publishing companies established in 1897
1897 establishments in Japan